Irish Academic Press is an independent Irish publishing house that was established in 1974, with a focus on Irish history, politics, literature and the arts.

History
Irish Academic Press was founded by Frank Cass in 1974 and, following his death in 2007, his son Stewart continued and expanded the business. In 2012, the publishing house was acquired by Conor Graham, and the company is now based in Newbridge, County Kildare.

Merrion Press
In 2012, Irish Academic Press launched the imprint Merrion Press, which publishes popular interest history, general interest and fiction. Their bestselling book to date has been Old Ireland in Colour.

References

External links

Publishing companies established in 1974
Publishing companies of Ireland
Book publishing companies of Ireland